Fables of Forgotten Things is a British television drama series that stars Doctor Who actor Paul McGann. In 2008 a pilot episode was made available on the BBC Website, and later broadcast on BBC HD in the Winter of 2009/10. However, no further episodes have yet been announced.

References 
 
Interview with Simon Allen, writer and co-creator on the SFX website
  Interview with Simon Allen, writer and co-creator on the Sci Fi Pulse website
  Paul McGann stars in a 2004 Doctor Who fever dream

British drama television series